Negros Navigation Co., Inc. (NENACO) was one of the oldest domestic shipping companies in the Philippines. It was also one of the largest companies in the passenger transport business in the Philippines. Its main hub was the renowned Pier 2 in Manila North Harbor. NENACO later merged with SuperCat, SuperFerry and Cebu Ferries to form 2GO Travel, the second largest Philippine shipping merger next to the William Lines-Gothong Lines-Aboitiz Shipping merger (WG&A) in 1996. At the same time, the China-Asean Investment Cooperation Fund, a private equity fund wholly owned by the government of the People's Republic of China through an equity infusion, gained a controlling interest in Negros Navigation and subsequently changed the company into the 2GO Group with 2GO Travel, its shipping-company subsidiary. The 'NENACO' brand was retired in mid-2012.

History
It was organized and registered with the Securities and Exchange Commission (SEC) on July 26, 1932, for the purpose of transporting passengers and cargo at ports of call in the Philippines.

In the 1960s Nenaco was the first among the domestic shipping companies to operate brand new, fast and luxurious air conditioned passenger ships. In the 70s, it was first to construct and operate a modern passenger terminal in Manila's North Harbor and likewise pioneered in offering special cruises to the Philippine tourist spots using its coastwise vessels. In the 1980s Nenaco launched its containerization program and ushered a new industry trend on the use of roll-on roll-off (“RORO”) vessels. It also deploys shuttle buses in Baclaran, Cubao and Alabang which takes passengers to the pier terminal.

In the 1990s, Nenaco became the first Philippine shipping company to be listed in the stock exchange. Proceeds amounting to P916.86 million from the initial public offering (IPO) were used to support the “Globalization Program” of the company that involved fleet expansion and service modernization.

Destinations
Negros Navigation served the following destinations in their final year, 2012.

Represented 2GO Travel

Luzon
Manila
Visayas
Bacolod
Dumaguete
Iloilo City
Cebu City
Tagbilaran City, Bohol
Mindanao
Cagayan de Oro
Dipolog
Iligan City, Lanao del Norte
Ozamiz City, Misamis Occidental
Butuan (via Nasipit)
Surigao City
Davao City
General Santos

Vessels
Negros Navigation operated the following passenger vessels until 2012:
 St. Joseph the Worker
 St. Peter the Apostle
 St. Michael the Archangel (final flagship)
 St. Ezekiel Moreno
 San Lorenzo Ruiz
 Mary Queen of Peace

Cargo vessels
 San Agustin Uno
 San Rafael Uno
 San Rafael Dos

Previous NENACO vessels under the management of:
 Antonio G. Hechanova, EVP/GM 1970-1979
 Daniel L. Lacson Jr. President/Chief Operating Officer 1979-2000 
 Emilio M. Capalla Jr. Head, Vessel Operation Division 1979-1995
 Capt. Reynaldo T. Marabe Fleets superintendent

Cruise vessel: Skipper
 MV Dona Montserrat: Capt. Antonio Batapa/Capt. Gerry Chio

Passenger vessels: Skippers
 MV Dona Florentina: Capt. Dominador Hortillosa Sr./Capt. Demetrio Britania 
 MV Don Julio: Capt. Reynaldo T. Marabe/Capt. Wilhelmino Subang
 MV Don Claudio: Capt. Federico Tupaz/Capt. Melencio Barranco 
 MV Don Juan: Capt. Antonio Tendencia/Capt. Demetrio Britania
 MV Don Juan (at the time of the incident): Capt. Roger Santisteban
 MV Don Vicente:
 MV Princess of Negros: Capt Wilfredo Chu
 MV Santa Ana

RoRo vessels: Skippers
 MV Santa Florentina: Capt. Boy Lanceta/Capt. Tendencia
 Santa Maria: Capt. Ephraim Bayaban

Previous CAT (Coastal Aquatic Technology) Craft under the supervision of:
 Bryant Peakpail 1994-2000
 Anna Butalid Blindone 2000-2003

Cargo vessel: Skipper
 MV Connie I : Capt. Roger Santisteban

Container vessels: Skippers
 MV Connie II: Capt. Rafael Dalde
 MV San Sebastian: Capt. Benjamin Montinola
Ferry boats: Skippers
 MV Don Vicente: Capt. Rommel Chu
 MV Princess of Negros: Capt. Tim Nepomuceno

Incidents
Reported casualties were 18 dead and 115 missing, with 745 survivors. This incident later served as an inspiration for the grandiose MassKara Festival of Bacolod.

See also

Cebu Ferries
Montenegro Lines
Gothong Southern
Supercat Fast Ferry Corporation (SFFC)
Roble Shipping Inc.

References

External links
Negros Navigation official website

Passenger ships of the Philippines
Shipping companies of the Philippines
Companies based in Manila
Defunct transportation companies of the Philippines